Zbigniew Makomaski (born 11 July 1931) is a Polish middle-distance runner. He competed in the men's 800 metres at the 1960 Summer Olympics.

References

1931 births
Living people
Athletes (track and field) at the 1960 Summer Olympics
Polish male middle-distance runners
Olympic athletes of Poland
Place of birth missing (living people)